John Bettesworth (1677–1751) was Dean of the Arches.

He was awarded Doctor of Laws (LL.D) and appointed both Dean of the Arches and Master of the Prerogative Court of Canterbury in 1710, serving in both capacities until his death in 1751.

He married in 1711 Elizabeth Jones, the daughter of Revd John Jones, rector of Selattyn, Shropshire and sister-in-law of Edmund Gibson, Bishop of London. He had a son, also John Bettesworth, who became Chancellor of London and a son, Edmund, who became vicar of Highworth, Wiltshire.

Bettesworth's coffin was discovered in 2017 beneath the floor of the mediaeval church of St Mary-at-Lambeth during refurbishment of the Garden Museum.

References

1751 deaths
1677 births
Burials at St Mary-at-Lambeth
Canterbury Cathedral